"Bart's Friend Falls in Love" is the twenty-third episode of the third season of the American animated television series The Simpsons (and the de facto season finale). It originally aired on the Fox network in the United States on May 7, 1992. In the episode, Bart's best friend Milhouse falls in love with the new girl in school, Samantha Stanky. Milhouse and Samantha spend all their free time together, leaving Bart feeling jealous and excluded. To sabotage Milhouse and Samantha's relationship, Bart tells her strict father about it. Samantha is sent to an all-girls Catholic school as punishment, leaving Milhouse heartbroken. Meanwhile, Homer orders a subliminal cassette tape to help him lose weight, but instead receives one that helps him increase his vocabulary after the weight-loss tape sells out.

The episode was written by Jay Kogen and Wallace Wolodarsky, and directed by Jim Reardon. American actress Kimmy Robertson guest starred in the episode as Samantha. The opening sequence of "Bart's Friend Falls in Love" is a parody of the film Raiders of the Lost Ark, while the closing sequence parodies the film Casablanca.

Since airing, the episode has received mostly positive reviews from television critics. It acquired a Nielsen rating of 12.4 and was the fourth highest-rated show on the Fox network the week it aired.

Plot
While riding the bus to school, Milhouse shows Bart his new fortune-telling toy, a Magic 8 ball. Bart asks the ball whether he and Milhouse will still be friends by the end of the day; the ball predicts they will not. A new girl from Phoenix, Samantha Stanky, arrives at Springfield Elementary School the same day, and Milhouse instantly falls in love with her. To Bart's dismay, Milhouse and Samantha start a relationship. Rather than playing with Bart alone after school, Milhouse brings Samantha to the treehouse and spends the entire time hugging and kissing her. They ignore Bart, leaving him in tears.

Milhouse and Samantha spend all their free time together. Feeling jealous and excluded, Bart reveals their relationship to Samantha's father. As punishment, Mr. Stanky sends Samantha to Saint Sebastian's School for Wicked Girls, a convent school run by French-Canadian nuns. After seeing Milhouse heartbroken, Bart begins to feel guilty for his actions. Bart and Milhouse pummel each other after Bart reveals that he snitched to Samantha's father. After calming down, the boys visit Samantha at the convent school, where Bart apologizes to her. Samantha says she loves Saint Sebastian's but still has feelings for Milhouse. She gives him a goodbye kiss despite knowing it is against the rules.

In the subplot, Lisa worries that Homer's obesity will lead to his early death. On Lisa's suggestion, Marge orders a subliminal weight loss tape for Homer. The company is out of weight loss tapes and sends him a vocabulary-enhancer tape instead, unbeknownst to Marge and the family. Homer falls asleep while listening to the tape. When he wakes up, he speaks a flowery, erudite English, but ends up eating more food than ever. Once he realizes he has gained rather than lost weight, Homer discards the tape and his vocabulary quickly returns to normal.

Production and allusions

The episode was written by Jay Kogen and Wallace Wolodarsky, and directed by Jim Reardon. American actress Kimmy Robertson guest starred in the episode as Samantha. She recorded all of her lines separately, instead of acting them out with the cast of the show in the recording studio as it is usually done. Robertson said of the role: "I had no idea how popular I was going to be after I did that. All my friends think I'm the bee's knees now. I've made it." The physical appearance of Samantha is based on Kogen's niece, who is also named Samantha.

When Samantha's father takes her away, Bart comforts Milhouse with some words from "In Memoriam" by Tennyson. The episode's opening sequence parodies that of the Steven Spielberg film Raiders of the Lost Ark (1981). Bart, in the role of Indiana Jones, steals a penny jar (instead of a Fertility Idol) from Homer before heading to school on the bus. Homer, standing in for the boulder and the Hovitos tribe, angrily runs after Bart. While Bart runs through the house, Maggie fires suction darts instead of arrows. Bart is able to narrowly pass through the closing garage door and escape. As Bart steps onto the bus, Homer is seen the distance shouting after him. John Williams' theme song from Raiders of the Lost Ark, "Raiders March", plays throughout the sequence. The producers had to contact Spielberg in order to clear the rights for the song so that they could use it in the episode. Paul Wee was the layout artist for the sequence. Marge's voice actor, Julie Kavner, praised it for focusing on the animation and having minimal dialogue.

The episode's closing sequence in which Bart and Milhouse visit Samantha at Saint Sebastian's is a reference to the film Casablanca. One nun leads a group of children and sings "Dominique", a song by The Singing Nun. Cast member Maggie Roswell provided the voice of the nun, but did she not know the actual French lyrics to the song so she made up her own. The writers had difficulties coming up with an idea for the end of the episode. Executive producer James L. Brooks pitched the idea of Samantha getting shipped off to a Catholic school with "fun nuns" that are like The Singing Nun. Other references in the episode include a scene in which Lisa reads a magazine with the headline "The Year 2525 - were Zager & Evans Right?", referring to musicians Zager and Evans and their song "In the Year 2525". Milhouse muses that his relationship with Samantha started like Romeo and Juliet but ended in tragedy, unaware that the play also ends in tragedy. Milhouse's original line in the scene was "It feel like somebody gave my heart a wedgie." Milhouse has a poster in his room featuring an X-wing from the Star Wars franchise.

Reception

In its original American broadcast, "Bart's Friend Falls in Love" finished 35th in the ratings for the week of May 4–10, 1992, with a Nielsen rating of 12.4, equivalent to approximately 11.4 million viewing households. It was the fourth highest-rated show on the Fox network that week, following Beverly Hills, 90210, In Living Color, and Married... with Children.

Since airing, the episode has received mostly positive reviews from television critics. The authors of the book I Can't Believe It's a Bigger and Better Updated Unofficial Simpsons Guide, Warren Martyn and Adrian Wood, said the episode was "a fitting end to a season that had seen The Simpsons consolidate its success and become even more daring and intelligent."

DVD Movie Guide's Colin Jacobson said that "from the ingenious and hilarious Raiders of the Lost Ark parody at the show’s start, 'Bart's Friend Falls in Love' is a keeper. It actually develops the characters and gets into pre-teen emotions but never becomes sappy. The 'B'-plot in which Lisa tries to get Homer to lose weight provides terrific laughs as well." Nate Meyers of Digitally Obsessed gave the episode a 4.5 out of 5 rating and commented that "It's tough to view Milhouse in a romantic relationship, especially since the most recent seasons have made a point of hinting at Milhouse being gay. Still, the love triangle makes for some interesting drama and the script's observations about childhood infatuations are right on point."

Bill Gibron of DVD Verdict, however, thought the plot seemed drawn out and "only Homer's eating disorder and subliminal tape attempts at weight loss have lasting appeal. Since the tape turns out to be a vocabulary builder, hearing Homer expound in flowery language is a real, rare treat." The Santa Fe New Mexican's Jeff Acker also preferred the subplot over the main plot.

The episode's Raiders of the Lost Ark parody was named the greatest film reference in the history of the show by Nathan Ditum of Total Film. Empire's Colin Kennedy also named it the best film parody in the show, calling it the series' "most famous opening sequence." He noted Homer played "both his roles – half-naked native; big fat boulder – with consummate aplomb." The Canadian television series The Hour, hosted by George Stroumboulopoulos, ranked the Raiders of the Lost Ark parody as the greatest in the "Top Five Male Underwear Moments of All Time". The list referred to scenes in film and television portraying men in underwear, and Homer wore underwear in the relevant scene.

References

External links

 
 

The Simpsons (season 3) episodes
1992 American television episodes
Television episodes about friendship